Cape Fear Roller Girls (CFRG) is a women's flat track roller derby league based in Wilmington, North Carolina. Founded in 2005, the league consists of two teams which compete against teams from other leagues, and is a member of the Women's Flat Track Derby Association (WFTDA).

History and organization
The league was established in November 2005 as the Cape Fear Killers, with assistance from the Carolina Rollergirls.  A skater from Cape Fear later founded Mass Attack Roller Derby.

Cape Fear was accepted into the Women's Flat Track Derby Association Apprentice Program in July 2010, and became a full member of the WFTDA in June 2011.

WFTDA rankings

References

Sports in Wilmington, North Carolina
Roller derby leagues established in 2005
Roller derby leagues in North Carolina
2005 establishments in North Carolina